Aldons Vrubļevskis (born 2 June 1957) is a Latvian lawyer and sports official. From 2004 to 2020 he was the president of the Latvian Olympic Committee.

He was the secretary general of the Latvian Olympic Committee from 1988 to 2004, and became the president of the Latvian Olympic Committee in 2004.

In collaboration with Olympic historian Mr. Genadijs Maricevs (LAT) is creating and publishing multivolume edition "Olympic Encyclopedia" (12 volumes are published 2016 - 2022 and two more are expected in 2023).

Awarded by the IOC "Pierre de Coubertin Medal" in 2020.

References

External links

1957 births
Living people
20th-century Latvian lawyers
Latvian sports executives and administrators
University of Latvia alumni
People from Jelgava Municipality
21st-century Latvian lawyers
Recipients of the Pierre de Coubertin medal